The Cook School for Christian Leadership is the educational branch of Cook Native American Ministries, an outreach and ministry organization located in Tempe, Arizona, and affiliated with the Presbyterian church.

References

External links
 Cook Native American Ministries

Buildings and structures in Tempe, Arizona
Education in Tempe, Arizona